Ran Yunfei (born 1965) is a Chinese writer and a high-profile democracy activist and blogger. He was arrested in late March 2011, shortly after the start of the 2011 Chinese pro-democracy protests, on charges of inciting subversion of state power. He was released in August 2011 and remains under residential surveillance. Ran expressed through social media that he converted to Christianity on 31 October 2015. He has been attending a Bible study since 2013.

Biography 
Ran is a member of the ethnic Tujia minority and was born in Youyang County, Chongqing. After graduating from Sichuan University, where he studied Chinese literature, in 1987, he was engaged in supporting the students who participated in the Tiananmen Square Protests. Because of the sweeping crackdown from the authorities, he went to Aba autonomous prefecture for a time. He works for the magazine Sichuan Literature and is a resident of Chengdu, Sichuan Province. 

Although he became a scholarly writer of Chinese classical culture hereafter, he was increasingly active in online writing. He is a prolific writer of social and political commentary. His blog is well known in China and his Twitter account has more than 44,000 followers. Ran was also among those who signed Charter 08.

Arrest 
In the backdrop of the 2011 Chinese pro-democracy protests, Ran was summoned to "tea" by public security on the morning of 20 February 2011 and detained. Officers later searched his home and confiscated his computer. On 24 February 2011, he was officially detained for "subversion of state power", according to a formal detention notice received by his wife. On 25 or 28 March 2011, he was formally arrested for inciting subversion of state power in China.

 He was released from arrest on 10 August 2011, and placed under residential surveillance.

References

External links 
 Ran Yunfei on Twitter
 Learning How to Argue: An Interview with Ran Yunfei, Interview in the New York Review of Books
 Writing by Ran Yunfei in Chinese, English and French

Living people
Chinese democracy activists
1965 births
Chinese bloggers
People's Republic of China essayists
Writers from Chongqing
Tujia people
Chinese prisoners and detainees
Sichuanese Protestants
Converts to Christianity